Edward Jennings VC (ca. 1820 – 10 May 1889) was an Irish recipient of the Victoria Cross, the highest and most prestigious award for gallantry in the face of the enemy that can be awarded to British and Commonwealth forces.

Details
He was approximately 37 years old, and a Rough-Rider in the Bengal Artillery, Bengal Army during the Indian Mutiny when the following deeds took place at the Relief of Lucknow for which he was awarded the VC:

Legacy
For most of his life Edward Jennings was employed by the local council as a road sweeper and must have fallen on hard times as he sold his Victoria Cross to a private collector. His Victoria Cross is owned by the Royal Artillery and is not on public display.

Edward Jennings VC died on 10 May 1889 and was buried in an unmarked pauper's grave, one of 190,000 bodies interred in Preston Cemetery, North Shields, North East England. In 1997 an appeal was launched to raise the necessary £2000 to place a headstone on Edward Jennings grave. A memorial service at graveside took place on 10 September 1997 to dedicate the new headstone.

References

Listed in order of publication year 
The Register of the Victoria Cross (1981, 1988 and 1997)

Ireland's VCs  (Dept of Economic Development, 1995)
Monuments to Courage (David Harvey, 1999)
Irish Winners of the Victoria Cross (Richard Doherty & David Truesdale, 2000)

External links
Location of grave and VC medal (Tyne & Wear)

1820s births
1889 deaths
19th-century Irish people
Bengal Artillery soldiers
British military personnel of the First Anglo-Sikh War
Indian Rebellion of 1857 recipients of the Victoria Cross
Irish recipients of the Victoria Cross
Irish soldiers in the British East India Company Army
Military personnel from County Mayo
People from North Shields